Ayesheh Dul (also Romanized as ‘Āyesheh Dūl) is a village in Quri Qaleh Rural District, Shahu District, Ravansar County, Kermanshah Province, Iran. At the 2006 census, its population was 37, in 8 families.

References 

Populated places in Ravansar County